Mackinac Island Airport  is a public use airport in Mackinac County, Michigan, United States. The airport is owned by Mackinac Island State Park Commission. It is included in the Federal Aviation Administration (FAA) National Plan of Integrated Airport Systems for 2017–2021, in which it is categorized as a basic general aviation facility.

History 
Mackinac Island Airport started as a grass strip in 1934. It got a paved runway in 1963 and a terminal building in 1969.  A $4.6 million project in 2011-2012 moved the runway 65 feet east to a flatter location.

The airport received $30,000 from the US Department of Transportation in 2020 as part of the CARES Act to help mitigate the effects of the covid-19 pandemic.

The aircraft has regularly scheduled passenger and cargo flights from Fresh Air Aviation. Great Lakes Air, which also served the airport, ceased operations in 2022.

Facilities and aircraft 
Mackinac Island Airport covers an area of 125 acres (51 ha) at an elevation of 739 feet (225 m) above mean sea level. It has one runway designated 8/26 with a concrete surface measuring 3,501 by 75 feet (1,067 x 23 m).

For the 12-month period ending December 31, 2018, the airport had 11,100 aircraft operations, with an average of 30 per day: 68% general aviation and 32% air taxi. In this period, there was only 1 aircraft reported based at the airport, a multi-engine aircraft.

The airport has a fixed-base operator with a crew lounge, but there is no fuel for sale.

 The airport is staffed September through May from 7:30AM until 5:30PM, and June through August from 8AM until 5PM.
 There is no fuel available at Mackinac Island Airport. The closest FBOs with fuel are in St. Ignace, Cheboygan, and Pellston.
 No camping is allowed on Mackinac Island, but nearby Bois Blanc island has an airstrip and allows camping at the field.
 Pilot Controlled Lighting is on 122.8, and UNICOM is on 122.7.
 The airport has MIRL lights and PAPI lights on each direction.

Island transit
 The airport is accessible by road from Annex Road, and is close to (but not directly accessible from) M-185, Michigan's only highway that prohibits vehicles. One special note is that no motorized vehicles with the exception of city emergency vehicles (police, fire and ambulance), city service vehicles and snowmobiles in winter are allowed on Mackinac Island. Travel on the island is accomplished on foot, bicycle, horse or horse-drawn carriage.
 Walking: The airport is about 1.6 miles by paved road from Market Street and the downtown area shops and restaurants.
 Taxi: The Mackinac Island Taxi Service (owned and operated by Carriage Tours) runs horse-drawn taxi carriages 24 hours a day from May to October, with limited hours from November to April.
 Bicycles: There are no bicycle rentals available at the airport, but there are several bicycle rental businesses downtown. Some private bikes can be stored in the racks outside the airport terminal.

Airlines and destinations

Incidents and accidents 
 On August 9, 2001, a Cessna P210 Centurion crashed while on approach to Mackinac Island. The pilot reported experiencing turbulence while in the traffic pattern. The stall horn sounded, so the pilot added power, but he was unable to remain clear of the trees around the airport. A witness reported the pilot's second approach appeared very low, and their turns were abnormal for the traffic pattern. The probable cause was found to be the pilot's failure to maintain proper glidepath during the landing approach resulting in the pilot not maintaining clearance from the trees.
 On July 13, 2010, a privately owned Beechcraft Baron 58, registered as N3081N, en route from Mackinac Island Airport to Chicago Executive Airport crashed shortly after takeoff from Mackinac County Airport where it had stopped to refuel. Four Israeli-American citizens were killed, and another was seriously injured.
 On December 3, 2011, a Great Lakes Air Piper PA-32-260 registered as N33315 crashed en route from St. Ignace, killing both passengers.
 In July and August 2013, a Cessna 172 and ERCO Ercoupe experienced weather issues on the runway, causing substantial damage to both aircraft.
 On February 26, 2018, a Piper PA 28 operated by Great Lakes Air was substantially damaged while landing at Mackinac Island. The pilot reported hearing a thud on approach, and the plane was reported to settle more than normal on landing. The pilot suspected a gear problem or blown tire and continued the landing; the plane settled further than normal and the right wing impacted the ground. The pilot maintained directional control with the rudder. It was found later that the right main landing gear had detached from the strut. The probable cause was found to be the improper reinstallation of the right main landing gear by maintenance personnel which resulted in the separation of the landing gear and the subsequent abnormal runway contact during the landing.
 On July 1, 2018, a Beech 58 aircraft overran the runway while rejecting a takeoff in which the airspeed indicator did not activate. The probable cause was found to be the pilot’s failure to remove the pitot tube cover during the preflight inspection, which resulted in his delayed decision to reject the takeoff with insufficient runway remaining to safely stop the airplane.

References

External links 
 Mackinac Island Airport official Facebook page
 Mackinac Island Airport webpage
 Mackinac Island Tourism Bureau
 Great Lakes Air Inc.
  at Michigan DOT Airport Directory
 Aerial image as of April 1998 from USGS The National Map
 

Airports in Michigan
Mackinac Island
Transportation in Mackinac County, Michigan
Buildings and structures in Mackinac County, Michigan
Historic district contributing properties in Michigan
National Register of Historic Places in Mackinac County, Michigan
Transportation buildings and structures on the National Register of Historic Places in Michigan
Airports on the National Register of Historic Places
Airports in the Upper Peninsula of Michigan